David Mitchell Suminski (June 18, 1931 – September 22, 2005) was an American football guard in the National Football League for the Chicago Cardinals and the Washington Redskins. He played college football at the University of Wisconsin and was drafted in the fifteenth round of the 1953 NFL Draft. Suminski also played 4 seasons in the Canadian Football League (1957–60) with the Hamilton Tiger-Cats where he twice selected as an All-Star. Suminski was born in Ashland, Wisconsin and graduated from Ashland High School in 1949. He served in the United States Army during the Korean War. He worked for the Ferry Morse Seed Company. He died at a hospital in Ashland, Wisconsin.

References

1931 births
2005 deaths
American football offensive guards
Chicago Cardinals players
Washington Redskins players
Hamilton Tiger-Cats players
Wisconsin Badgers football players
People from Ashland, Wisconsin
Military personnel from Wisconsin
Players of American football from Wisconsin